Benny or Bennie is a given name. 

It may also refer to:

People:
 Bennie (surname)
 Benny (surname)
 Benny (footballer), Portuguese footballer Bernardo Pereira Silvano (born 1996)
 Benny (slang), a derogatory term used by residents of Jersey Shore towns for tourists that visit each summer
 Character (Benny Hawkins) in the British soap opera Crossroads

Other uses
 slang for Benzedrine, an amphetamine
 slang for Eggs Benedict, a dish
 Benny Award, the highest honour that can be bestowed to a New Zealand variety entertainer
 Benny, Ontario, Canada, an unincorporated community